The 1965 Bulgarian Cup Final was the 25th final of the Bulgarian Cup (in this period the tournament was named Cup of the Soviet Army), and was contested between CSKA Sofia and Levski Sofia on 8 September 1965 at Ovcha Kupel Stadium in Sofia. CSKA won the final 3–2.

Route to the Final

Match

Details

See also
1964–65 A Group

References

Bulgarian Cup finals
PFC CSKA Sofia matches
PFC Levski Sofia matches
Cup Final